Norwalk, Connecticut, has been home to numerous notable people, residents and others, past and present.

See also:

https://en.m.wikipedia.org/wiki/Rowayton,_Connecticut?searchToken=44laps21mgis803113xu8hv3x#Notable_people

Authors, writers

 Faith Baldwin (1893–1978), novelist; worked with the Famous Writers School; lived in the Silvermine neighborhood and died in Norwalk
 Brian Basset (born 1957), Seattle-based cartoonist; born in the city
 A. Scott Berg (born 1949), award-winning biographer; born in Norwalk
 F.R. Buckley (1896–1976) lived in Norwalk
 Tom Curry (1900–1976), pulp fiction writer
 Philip Caputo (born 1941), author
 Stanley Dance (1910–1999), jazz writer, biographer of Duke Ellington 
 Peter De Vries (1910–1983), writer, editor, novelist, worked on The New Yorker magazine for many years
 Alyse Gregory (1884–1967), suffragist, journalist, and novelist; born in Norwalk
 Johnny Gruelle (1880–1938), artist and author; creator of Raggedy Ann; lived in town
 Bob Grumman (1941–2015), minimalist poet
 Emma Johnson (born 1976), podcast host and blogger
 Steven Kellogg (born 1941), author and illustrator of children's books; born in Norwalk
 Sheila Lukins (1942–2009), cook and food writer
 Warren E. Preece (1921–2007), editor of Encyclopædia Britannicas 15th edition
 Andy Rooney (1919–2011), commentator on 60 Minutes television newsmagazine on CBS
 Peter St. John, poet during the American Revolution
 Stephen W. Sears (born 1932), Civil War historian; lives in Norwalk
 Sloan Wilson (1920–2003), author; was born in the city
 Wayne Winsley (born 1963), broadcaster and author; former resident

Actors, musicians, entertainers

 Roger Bart (born 1962), Broadway actor; born in Norwalk
 Jesse Bradford (born 1979), film actor; born in Norwalk
 D.J. Caruso (born 1965), movie and television director; born in the city and attended Norwalk High School
 Helen Curry (1896–1931), actress; died at her home in the city
 Ruth Chatterton (1892–1961), actress, writer and aviator; died in the city in 1961
 Charli D'Amelio (born 2004), dancer and social media personality
 Dixie D'Amelio (born 2001), social media personality and singer
 Robin de Jesús (born 1984), film and theater actor
 Frances Dee (1909–2004), actress; died in the city
 Mat Devine (born 1974), lead singer of Kill Hannah
 Violet Englefield (1881–1946), actress and singer; lived in Norwalk 1930–1939
 Ellen Hanley (1926–2007), musical theater performer
 Eileen Heckart (1919–2001), actress; died at her home in the city
 Clegg Hoyt (1910–1967), film and television actor; born in Norwalk
 Sarah Jacobson (1971–2004), independent filmmaker; born in Norwalk
 Mitch Longley (born 1965), television actor; graduated from Brien McMahon High School
 Forrest McClendon, Tony Award-nominated actor (The Scottsboro Boys)
 Vince Mendoza (born 1961), music arranger and composer; born in Norwalk
 Farrad Mullins (born 1976), musician and performer based in New York City; born in Norwalk
 Christopher Schreiner (born 1983), guitarist; born in Norwalk
 Artie Shaw (1910–2004), Big Band composer; lived in Norwalk in the 1950s
 Horace Silver (1928–2014), jazz pianist and composer; born in the city
 John Simon (born 1941),  musician, record producer, and composer; born in Norwalk
 Joan Wasser (born 1970), violinist and singer-songwriter; was raised in the city
 Chris Webby (Christian Webster), rapper; grew up in Norwalk
 Bruce Weitz (born 1943), actor; was born in Norwalk
 Treat Williams (born 1951), actor; Rowayton resident
 Remy Zaken (born 1989), stage and television actress

Sports

 Érik Bédard (born 1979), pitcher for the Baltimore Orioles; went to Norwalk Community College
 Paul Gerken (born 1950), professional tennis player
 Mickey Kydes, soccer player for the NY/NJ MetroStars of Major League Soccer
 Randy LaJoie (born 1961), two-time champion driver in the NASCAR Busch Series (now the (Xfinity Series)
 Bob Miller (1929–2006), NFL Detroit Lions football player (1952–1958); born in the city
 Marie Corridon Mortell (1930–2010), won a gold medal in the 4 × 100 m relay in swimming at the 1948 Summer Olympics in London
 Kevin Morton, former pitcher for the Boston Red Sox
 Calvin Murphy (born 1948), former NBA basketball player; grew up in town
 Idris Price (born 1976), football player for the Tampa Bay Buccaneers
 Rita Williams (born 1976), WNBA Basketball player (1998–2003) Washington Mystics
 Scott Sharp (born 1968), auto racer, Indy Racing League champion; currently an American Le Mans Series owner-driver in the GT class
 Leif Shiras (born 1959), former tennis player and tennis journalist
 Dan Sileo (born 1963), former football player for the Tampa Bay Buccaneers, lived in Norwalk
 Tarvis Simms (born 1971), middleweight boxer; Golden Gloves champion; South Norwalk native
 Travis Simms (born 1971), welterweight champion of the World Boxing Association (as of January 2007); South Norwalk native
 Mo Vaughn (born 1967), former baseball player
 Luke Vercollone (born 1982), professional soccer player with the Charleston Battery; grew up in Norwalk
 Daniel Walsh (born 1979), rower and winner of a bronze medal in rowing at the 2008 Summer Olympics

Government and politics

 Audrey P. Beck (1931–1983), college professor and Connecticut state legislator
 William Benton (1900–1973), U.S. Senator; later publisher of the Encyclopædia Britannica; lived in the city
 Thaddeus Betts (1789–1840), United States Senator from Connecticut
 William Thomas Clark (1831–1905), American Civil War general, U.S. Congressman, and abolitionist
 Darius N. Couch (1822–1897), naturalist and Union general in the Civil War; died in Norwalk
 Jeremiah Donovan (1857–1935), mayor and U.S. Congressman
 Thomas Fitch (1696–1774), colonial Governor of Connecticut
 Thomas Fitch, V (1725–1795), state representative; widely believed to be the original "Yankee Doodle Dandy"
 Irving Freese, five-term mayor of Norwalk; one of the few Socialists ever elected mayor in the United States
 Mary F. Hoyt, first woman to receive a position in the United States federal civil service
 Boris Johnson, prime minister of the United Kingdom, grew up in the city
 Alex Knopp, two-term mayor of Norwalk, 2001–2005
 Mia Love, United States Representative; raised in Norwalk
 Brien McMahon (1903–1952), United States Senator (D-CT), authored the Atomic Energy Act of 1946; born, raised, and is buried in Norwalk; namesake of one of the city's high schools
 Dick Moccia, elected mayor of Norwalk, Connecticut on November 8, 2005
 Isaac Sears (1729/1730–1786), merchant, sailor, and political figure during the American Revolution; raised in Norwalk
 Roger Stone (born 1952), Political consultant and author; renowned Conservative and avid supporter of the 45th President of the United States, Donald Trump
 Levi Warner (1831–1911), United States Representative from Connecticut
 Peter Willcox (born 1953), Greenpeace activist and former captain of the Rainbow Warrior; was raised in the city

Other

 Daniel T. Barry (born 1953), retired NASA astronaut; born in Norwalk
 Azor Betts (1740–1809), doctor who promoted smallpox inoculation
 Donald Drew Egbert (1902-1973), art historian and educator
 Sarah Louise Bouton Felt (1850–1928), first general president of the children's Primary organization of the Church of Jesus Christ of Latter-Day Saints
 Francis Gregory (1780–1866), U.S. Navy officer in the War of 1812 and the American Civil War; born in Norwalk
 Edward Calvin Kendall (1886–1972), chemist and Nobel Prize for Physiology or Medicine winner in 1950; born in South Norwalk
 LeGrand Lockwood (died February 1872), Wall Street financier; builder of the Lockwood-Mathews Mansion in Norwalk
 John D. Magrath (1924–1945), World War II Medal of Honor recipient; born in East Norwalk and is buried in Norwalk
 Charles O. Perry (1929–2011), sculptor, lived in East Norwalk and had his art studio in South Norwalk from 1977 until his death
 Alexander Rummler (1867–1959), painter, lived in the city for 35 years painting many scenes of Norwalk life
 Daniel J. Shea (1947–1969), recipient of the Medal of Honor in the Vietnam War; Shea Island in the Norwalk Islands was renamed in his honor
 Charles Robert Sherman (1788–1829), lawyer, Ohio public servant; father of William Tecumseh Sherman; born in Norwalk
 Mary Emma Woolley (1863–1947), president of Mount Holyoke College, 1901–1937; born in South Norwalk

See also

 List of people from Connecticut
 List of people from Bridgeport, Connecticut
 List of people from Brookfield, Connecticut
 List of people from Darien, Connecticut
 List of people from Greenwich, Connecticut
 List of people from Hartford, Connecticut
 List of people from New Canaan, Connecticut
 List of people from New Haven, Connecticut
 List of people from Redding, Connecticut
 List of people from Ridgefield, Connecticut
 List of people from Stamford, Connecticut
 List of people from Westport, Connecticut

Footnotes

Norwalk Connecticut